Sebastiano Ranfagni (born 8 August 1985) is a male Italian swimmer.

Biography
In 2012 Sebastiano Ranfagni qualified for his first Olympic appearance in London 2012.  There he competed in the men's 200 m backstroke, being knocked out in the first round.

Ranfagni was born in Germany, but is Italian citizen, he is very tall, at 205 cm.

References

External links
Official site

1985 births
Living people
Italian male swimmers
Italian male backstroke swimmers
Olympic swimmers of Italy
Swimmers at the 2012 Summer Olympics
Swimmers of Centro Sportivo Carabinieri
Mediterranean Games silver medalists for Italy
Swimmers at the 2009 Mediterranean Games
Universiade medalists in swimming
Mediterranean Games medalists in swimming
Universiade bronze medalists for Italy
Medalists at the 2011 Summer Universiade
21st-century Italian people